The 2021 Canadian Mixed Doubles Curling Championship (branded as the 2021 Home Hardware Canadian Mixed Doubles Curling Championship for sponsorship reasons) was held from March 18 to 25 at the Markin MacPhail Centre at Canada Olympic Park in Calgary, Alberta. The winning pair of Kerri Einarson and Brad Gushue represented Canada at the 2021 World Mixed Doubles Curling Championship in Aberdeen, Scotland

Due to the COVID-19 pandemic in Canada, it was announced that most Curling Canada championships still being held in the 2020–21 curling season would be moved to a centralized "bubble" (similar to that of the NHL as in Edmonton) at Canada Olympic Park. All events will be held behind closed doors with no spectators. In addition, due to COVID-19 restrictions and logistics, most provincial playdowns have been cancelled, with teams being selected by their respective member associations.

During the night of Sunday, March 21, Darren Moulding was experiencing back spasms, forcing him and partner Joanne Courtney to forfeit their match the next morning. Later that day, the duo officially pulled out of the competition.

Teams

Due to the cancellation of the 2020 Canadian Mixed Doubles Curling Championship, the 2021 championship used a new format including 35 teams.

The teams are listed as follows:

Provincial and territorial representatives

Canadian Mixed Doubles Ranking qualifiers

Teams unable to play during the 2020–21 season

Seven teams who were unable to compete during the 2020–21 season due to the COVID-19 pandemic in Canada also qualified for the event. Each player was ranked based on their top three CTRS events during the 2019–20 season. Both players must also be part of Curling Canada's National Team program.

Round-robin standings
Final round-robin standings

Round-robin results

All draw times are listed in Mountain Standard Time (UTC−07:00).

Draw 1
Thursday, March 18, 8:30 am

Draw 2
Thursday, March 18, 11:30 am

Draw 3
Thursday, March 18, 2:30 pm

Draw 4
Thursday, March 18, 5:30 pm

Draw 5
Thursday, March 18, 8:30 pm

Draw 6
Friday, March 19, 8:30 am

Draw 7
Friday, March 19, 11:30 am

Draw 8
Friday, March 19, 2:30 pm

Draw 9
Friday, March 19, 5:30 pm

Draw 10
Friday, March 19, 8:30 pm

Draw 11
Saturday, March 20, 8:30 am

Draw 12
Saturday, March 20, 11:30 am

Draw 13
Saturday, March 20, 2:30 pm

Draw 14
Saturday, March 20, 5:30 pm

Draw 15
Saturday, March 20, 8:30 pm

Draw 16
Sunday, March 21, 8:30 am

Draw 17
Sunday, March 21, 11:30 am

Draw 18
Sunday, March 21, 2:30 pm

Draw 19
Sunday, March 21, 5:30 pm

Draw 20
Sunday, March 21, 8:30 pm

Draw 21
Monday, March 22, 8:30 am

Draw 22
Monday, March 22, 11:30 am

Draw 23
Monday, March 22, 2:30 pm

Draw 24
Monday, March 22, 5:30 pm

Draw 25
Monday, March 22, 8:30 pm

Draw 26
Tuesday, March 23, 8:30 am

Draw 27
Tuesday, March 23, 11:30 am

Draw 28
Tuesday, March 23, 2:30 pm

Championship round

Round of 12
Tuesday, March 23, 6:30 pm

Round of 8
Wednesday, March 24, 10:30 am

Page Seeding
Wednesday, March 24, 2:30 pm

Playoffs

1 vs. 2
Wednesday, March 24, 6:30 pm

3 vs. 4
Wednesday, March 24, 6:30 pm

Semifinal
Thursday, March 25, 2:00 pm

Final
Thursday, March 25, 7:00 pm

Final standings

Notes

References

External links

Canadian Mixed Doubles Curling Championship
2021 in Canadian curling
Curling in Alberta
2021 in Alberta
Canadian Mixed Doubles Curling
Sport in Calgary